Guy Bertram Wolstenholme (8 March 1931 – 9 October 1984) was an English professional golfer. He had a successful career both as an amateur and then as a professional.

Early life 
Wolstenholme was born in Leicester, and is the father of Gary Wolstenholme.

Amateur career 
As an amateur, Wolstenholme won both the English stroke play and match play championships, the latter on two occasions. He also won several other prestigious titles, including the Berkshire Trophy three times, and the German Amateur Championship in 1956. Wolstenholme remains one the few amateur golfers to have won both The Berkshire and Brabazon Trophies in the same calendar year, the others being Philip Scrutton (1952), Michael Bonallack (1968, 1971), Peter Hedges (1976), Sandy Lyle (1977) and Jeremy Robinson (1987). He played on the Great Britain and Ireland team in the 1957 and 1959 Walker Cup matches and the 1958 and 1960 Eisenhower Trophy, finishing third both years. The highlight of his amateur career came in 1960, when finishing 6th, and low amateur, in The Open Championship at St Andrews.

Professional career 
Wolstenholme turned professional in 1960, and played for several years on the European Circuit, and later the European Tour following its formation in the early 1970s. Despite joining the pro ranks relatively late, he had considerable success, winning 5 tournaments including the British PGA Close Championship and three national opens. He also broke the record for the greatest winning margin on the circuit, when he won the 1963 Jeyes Tournament at Royal Dublin by 12 strokes. He emigrated to Australia in the 1960s and enjoyed more successes, winning several tournaments including the Victorian Open on four occasions.

Wolstenholme played on the Senior PGA Tour (now the Champions Tour) in the United States in 1982 and 1983. He recorded two runner-up finishes, in the 1982 Greater Syracuse Senior's Pro Golf Classic and the 1983 Daytona Beach Seniors Golf Classic, and ended the season 8th on the money list in 1983.

Wolstenholme died in 1984 after losing his fight against cancer.

Amateur wins
1956 English Amateur, Berkshire Trophy, German Amateur Open Championship
1957 Golf Illustrated Gold Vase
1958 Berkshire Trophy (tie with Arthur Perowne)
1959 English Amateur
1960 Brabazon Trophy, Berkshire Trophy

Professional wins (19)

PGA Tour of Australasia wins (3)

PGA Tour of Australasia playoff record (2–0)

Other Australia and New Zealand wins (7)
1968 Sax Altman Tournament (tie with Peter Thomson)
1969 West End Tournament
1970 Endeavour Masters
1971 South Australian Open, Victorian Open, City of Auckland Classic
1975 Victorian PGA Championship

Asia Golf Circuit wins (1)
1969 Yomiuri International

Other wins (5)
1961 Southern Professional Championship
1963 Jeyes Tournament
1966 British PGA Close Championship
1967 Kenya Open, Denmark Open
1969 Dutch Open
1971 Kuzuha International

Senior wins (1)
1981 Australian Seniors Championship

Results in major championships
Amateur

Professional

Note: Wolstenholme played only in The Open Championship, U.S. Amateur and The Amateur Championship

LA = Low Amateur
CUT = missed the half-way cut (3rd round cut in 1968 Open Championship)
"T" indicates a tie for a place
R64, R32, R16, QF, SF = Round in which player lost in match play

Source for U.S. Amateur: USGA Championship Database

Source for British Amateur: The Glasgow Herald, 29 May 1953, p. 4., The Glasgow Herald, 27 May 1954, p. 4., The Glasgow Herald, 3 June 1955, p. 4., The Glasgow Herald, 30 May 1956, p. 4., The Glasgow Herald, 29 May 1957, p. 4., The Glasgow Herald, 6 June 1958, p. 4., The Glasgow Herald, 30 May 1959, p. 9., The Glasgow Herald, 26 May 1960, p. 13.

Team appearances
Amateur
Eisenhower Trophy (representing Great Britain & Ireland): 1958, 1960
Walker Cup (representing Great Britain & Ireland): 1957, 1959
Amateurs–Professionals Match (representing the Amateurs): 1956, 1957, 1958 (winners), 1960
St Andrews Trophy (representing Great Britain & Ireland): 1956 (winners)
Commonwealth Tournament (representing Great Britain): 1959

Professional
Canada Cup (representing England): 1965
Double Diamond International: 1972 (Rest of the World), 1976 (Australasia)

References

External links

English male golfers
European Tour golfers
PGA Tour Champions golfers
1931 births
1984 deaths